Yerington is a city in Lyon County, Nevada, United States. The population was 3,048 at the 2010 census.  It is the current county seat of Lyon County, with the first county seat having been established at Dayton on November 29, 1861.  It is named after Henry M. Yerington, superintendent of the Virginia and Truckee Railroad from 1868 to 1910.

History

Native people
The Yerington Paiute Tribe of the Yerington Colony and Campbell Ranch is headquartered in Yerington. The people, known as Namu (human beings) in their own language, have lived in the Smith and Mason Valleys in Northwestern Nevada, since around 1000 A.D.

City
The community was formerly named Greenfield, Mason Valley, and Pizen Switch (irreverent nickname from the time where Yerington was a transfer - or switch - stop; and the local whiskey was so bad that it was called "poison". "Poison" came out sounding like "pizen" because of local vernacular, and the name "Pizen Switch" stuck.)  

It was founded on August 6, 1871. The city was incorporated on March 17, 1907. 

After the Dayton Court House burned down in 1909, the county seat was moved to Yerington in 1911.

Wilson Ranch fire balloon
During World War II, one of many Japanese Fu-Go balloon bombs launched at the United States landed on the Wilson Ranch near Yerington. The ranchers, not knowing what it was, attempted to notify the authorities by mail, but did not receive a response until after they cut it up and used it as a hay tarp.

Geography
Yerington is located at the intersection of US 95A and Nevada State Route 208.

It flows into the Mason Valley where Yerington is located, and is used for irrigation.

Climate
Yerington experiences a borderline cool desert climate (Köppen BWk)/cool semi-arid climate (BSk). Yerington is noticeably more arid than areas even marginally closer to the Sierra Nevada – it receives only half as much precipitation as Carson City, a third as much as South Lake Tahoe and only one-eighth as much as Nevada City, California on the western Sierra slopes. January 2017 proved the first month to exceed  of precipitation when it totaled .

During the summer, temperatures are generally hot to very hot in the afternoon, but the high altitude and low humidity means temperature drop to a comfortable level at night. On average, 8.0 afternoons each summer will exceed  and 73.2 afternoons reach . It is rare, though, that minima stay above , although thirteen mornings stayed this warm in 2015. The hottest minimum has been  on July 22, 2003, and the hottest temperature  on July 15, 2014. In the winter, afternoons are sunny and cool to cold with all but 4.6 topping freezing on average, although mornings typically range from freezing to frigid: 135.5 mornings fall below freezing in an average year and 0.6 fall to or below .

Demographics

For the 2010 census, basic statistics show there were 3,048 people, 1,302 households, and 747 families residing in the city. The population density was 1792.9 people per square mile. There were 1,507 housing units at an average density of 886.5 per square mile. The racial makeup of the city was 80.20% White, 0.60% African American, 6.80% Native American, 0.60% Asian, 8.90% from other races, and 3.00% from two or more races. Hispanic or Latino of any race were 18.80% of the population.

In comparison, during the census  of 2000, there were 2,883 people, 1,203 households, and 729 families residing in the city. The population density was 1,698.4 people per square mile. There were 1,359 housing units at an average density of 800.6 per square mile. The racial makeup of the city was 84.53% White, 0.17% African American, 6.24% Native American, 0.38% Asian, 5.79% from other races, and 2.88% from two or more races. Hispanic or Latino of any race were 15.44% of the population.

There were 1,203 households, out of which 27.7% had children under the age of 18 living with them, 46.1% were married couples living together, 10.2% had a female householder with no husband present, and 39.4% were non-families. 35.0% of all households were made up of individuals, and 19.6% had someone living alone who was 65 years of age or older. The average household size was 2.29, and the average family size was 2.97.

In the city, the population was spread out, with 24.7% under the age of 18, 8.1% from 18 to 24, 22.2% from 25 to 44, 19.4% from 45 to 64, and 25.7% who were 65 years of age or older. The median age was 41 years. For every 100 females, there were 99.1 males. For every 100 females age 18 and over, there were 92.7 males.

The median income for a household in the city was $31,151, and the median income for a family was $39,038. Males had a median income of $25,724 versus $24,550 for females. The per capita income for the city was $18,640. About 12.6% of families and 17.9% of the population were below the poverty line, including 26.2% of those under age 18 and 12.3% of those age 65 or over.

In popular culture
"Darcy Farrow," a folk song written by Steve Gillette and Tom Campbell, mentions Yerington ("Her eyes shone bright like the pretty lights / That shine in the night out of Yerington town," 7–8) and other places and landmarks in the area, including Virginia City, the Carson Valley, and the Truckee River. Critics have noted the geographical inaccuracy in the line "The Walker runs down to the Carson Valley plain."

Notable people
 Nevada Barr, (1952– ) mystery writer, created the Anna Pigeon series
 Jesse Brinkley, (1976– ) professional boxer, contestant on season one of The Contender
 Joe Dini, (1929–2014) long time member of the Nevada Assembly
 Wovoka, (1856–1932) also known as Jack Wilson. Paiute religious leader

See also

 Anaconda Copper Mine (Nevada)

References

External links

 City of Yerington official website

1871 establishments in Nevada
Cities in Lyon County, Nevada
Cities in Nevada
County seats in Nevada
Populated places established in 1871